Maurice Boulanger (born 13 April 1909, date of death unknown) was a Belgian athlete. He competed in the men's decathlon at the 1936 Summer Olympics.

References

External links
 

1909 births
Year of death missing
Athletes (track and field) at the 1936 Summer Olympics
Belgian decathletes
Olympic athletes of Belgium
Place of birth missing